Nikolay Konstantinovich Kruglov (born 31 January 1950) is a former Soviet Union biathlete. At the 1976 Olympics in Innsbruck he won gold medals in the 20 km individual and with the men's relay team. He became world champion in the sprint event at the 1975 World Championships in Antholz.

His son, Nikolay Kruglov, Jr., also became a biathlete.

Biathlon results
All results are sourced from the International Biathlon Union.

Olympic Games
2 medals (2 gold)

World Championships
8 medals (3 gold, 3 silver, 2 bronze)

*During Olympic seasons competitions are only held for those events not included in the Olympic program.

Individual victories
1 victory (1 In)

*Results are from UIPMB and IBU races which include the Biathlon World Cup, Biathlon World Championships and the Winter Olympic Games.

References

1950 births
Living people
Soviet male biathletes
Biathletes at the 1976 Winter Olympics
Olympic biathletes of the Soviet Union
Medalists at the 1976 Winter Olympics
Olympic medalists in biathlon
Olympic gold medalists for the Soviet Union
Biathlon World Championships medalists
21st-century Ukrainian politicians